Endarterectomy is a surgical procedure to remove the atheromatous plaque material, or blockage, in the lining of an artery constricted by the buildup of deposits. It is carried out by separating the plaque from the arterial wall.

It was first performed on a subsartorial artery in 1946 by a Portuguese surgeon, João Cid dos Santos, at the University of Lisbon. In 1951, E. J. Wylie, an American, performed it on the abdominal aorta. The first successful reconstruction of the carotid artery was performed by Carrea, Molins, and Murphy in Argentina, later in the same year.

An endarterectomy of the carotid artery in the neck is recommended to reduce the risk of stroke when the carotid artery is severely narrowed, particularly after a stroke to reduce the risk of additional strokes.

Coronary endarterectomy involves removing atheroma from the wall of blocked blood vessels (coronary) supplying the heart muscle. The concept was first introduced by Bailey in the 1950s prior to the advent of coronary artery bypass surgery to help patients with angina and coronary artery disease. It is still used today when coronary artery bypass surgery proves difficult. Livesay in Texas and Nair in Leeds have published the largest series in the world.

A femoral endarterectomy is also frequently used as a supplement to a vein bypass graft at the sites of surgical anastomosis. Pulmonary hypertension caused by chronic thromboembolic disease (CTEPH) may be amenable to pulmonary thromboendarterectomy of the pulmonary artery. This procedure was refined by Jamieson over the last two decades and his technique has become the standard worldwide.

See also
 Atherectomy
 Pulmonary thromboendarterectomy

References

External links
 
 

Vascular surgical procedures